Judge Jerry is an American arbitration-based reality court show presided over by Jerry Springer, who previously hosted Jerry Springer from 1991 to 2018. The series began its run in first-run syndication on September 9, 2019, and was distributed by NBCUniversal Syndication Studios.

In February 2020, the series was renewed for a second season. In March 2021, the series was renewed for a third season. In March 2022, the series was canceled after three seasons.

Production

Development
Host Jerry Springer had planned on retiring after his tabloid talk show ended production in 2018. NBCUniversal, which had syndicated that tabloid talk show, was interested in retaining Springer's services and convinced him to take on hosting duties for an arbitration court show, the distributor's first entry into the genre. Springer was intrigued by the opportunity to host a more "grown-up" program and to use his law school education.

The signature "Jerry! Jerry!" chant was carried over to Judge Jerry, albeit only during the warm-up and never during the actual proceedings. Cases for Judge Jerry were chosen from pending small claims court cases that had already been filed in jurisdictions across the United States; according to Springer, this was to prevent litigants from purposely seeking out the show to earn 15 minutes of fame, a problem that had occasionally come up during the run of Jerry Springer. In regard to his judicial style, Springer largely played it straight, though he noted: "invariably I crack jokes because I can't help it... even if I have to be stern I'm never going to be mean."

On February 5, 2020, the series was renewed for a second season. On March 23, 2021, the series was renewed for a third season, with the intent of presiding over more outrageous and entertaining cases compared to the previous two years. On March 9, 2022, the series was canceled after three seasons.

Filming
The show was filmed in front of a live audience at NBCUniversal's Stamford Media Center in Stamford, Connecticut. The show was taped in sessions of 30 to 35 cases every other week.

References

External links

2010s American legal television series
2010s American reality television series
2019 American television series debuts
2022 American television series endings
2020s American legal television series
2020s American reality television series
Arbitration courts and tribunals
Court shows
English-language television shows
First-run syndicated television programs in the United States
Television series by Universal Television
Television shows filmed in Connecticut